

238001–238100 

|-bgcolor=#f2f2f2
| colspan=4 align=center | 
|}

238101–238200 

|-id=129
| 238129 Bernardwolfe ||  || Bernard Wolfe (1915–1985), an American science-fiction writer. || 
|}

238201–238300 

|-bgcolor=#f2f2f2
| colspan=4 align=center | 
|}

238301–238400 

|-bgcolor=#f2f2f2
| colspan=4 align=center | 
|}

238401–238500 

|-bgcolor=#f2f2f2
| colspan=4 align=center | 
|}

238501–238600 

|-id=593
| 238593 Paysdegex || 2005 AS || The French astronomy club Orion is situated in Pays de Gex, near Geneva. || 
|}

238601–238700 

|-bgcolor=#f2f2f2
| colspan=4 align=center | 
|}

238701–238800 

|-id=710
| 238710 Halassy ||  || Olivér Halassy (1909–1946), a Hungarian water polo player and freestyle swimmer, who won two gold and one silver medal in three Summer Olympic Games between 1928 and 1936. || 
|-id=771
| 238771 Juhászbalázs ||  || Balázs Juhász (1992–2012), Hungarian astronomer who died during his night assistant work at the Konkoly Observatory || 
|}

238801–238900 

|-id=817
| 238817 Titeuf ||  || Titeuf is the title of a comic strip and the name of its teenage hero, created by Swiss cartoonist Philippe Chappuis (born 1967), better known as Zep. || 
|}

238901–239000 

|-bgcolor=#f2f2f2
| colspan=4 align=center | 
|}

References 

238001-239000